The Grand Army of the Republic Memorial Hall, also known as William Baumer Post No. 24, Grand Army of the Republic (GAR), and as the Civil War Veterans Museum, is a historic building located at 908 (now 910) 1st Corso in Nebraska City, Nebraska, in the United States. The hall was built in 1894–95.  In 1994, it was added to the U.S. National Register of Historic Places.

History
The Richardsonian Romanesque Grand Army of the Republic Memorial Hall was designed and built in 1894–95 by architects Fisher & Lawrie, and was the meeting place of the William Baumer Post No. 24, which was one of 354 GAR posts in Nebraska. The hall has been restored and is now the Civil War Veterans Museum at the G.A.R. Memorial Hall.

See also
 Grand Army of the Republic Hall (disambiguation)
 List of Registered Historic Places in Nebraska
 Sons of Union Veterans of the Civil War

References

External links
 Civil War Veterans Museum at the G.A.R. Memorial Hall
 William Baumer Post 24, GAR
 
 Library of Congress lists of GAR posts by state

Clubhouses on the National Register of Historic Places in Nebraska
Nebraska
American Civil War museums in Nebraska
Museums in Otoe County, Nebraska
Buildings and structures in Nebraska City, Nebraska
Tourist attractions in Nebraska City, Nebraska
National Register of Historic Places in Otoe County, Nebraska
1895 establishments in Nebraska
Buildings and structures completed in 1895